Scott Township, Ohio may refer to:

Scott Township, Adams County, Ohio
Scott Township, Brown County, Ohio
Scott Township, Marion County, Ohio
Scott Township, Sandusky County, Ohio

See also
Scott Township (disambiguation)
 

Ohio township disambiguation pages